Tyler Williams may refer to:

 Tyler James Williams (born 1992), American actor and musician
 Tyler Williams (cyclist) (born 1994), American cyclist
 T-Minus (record producer) (born Tyler Williams, born 1988), Canadian record producer